Elections to Gosport Borough Council were held on 6 May 1999.  One third of the council was up for election and the council stayed under no overall control.

After the election, the composition of the council was
Labour 11
Conservative 10
Liberal Democrat 7
Others 2

Election result

References
1999 Gosport election result

1999
1999 English local elections
1990s in Hampshire